Charles Raulerson (born January 29, 1964) is an American professional golfer who played on the PGA Tour and the Nationwide Tour.

Raulerson joined the Nationwide Tour in 1990. He went through PGA Tour qualifying school in 1993 and joined the Tour in 1994. After a poor year on Tour he took a hiatus from Tour until 1998 when he rejoined the Nationwide Tour. He won two events that year, the Nike Oregon Classic and the Nike Inland Empire Open en route to a 7th-place finish on the money list. He returned to the PGA Tour in 1999 and spent two years on Tour before returning to the Nationwide Tour in 2001. He played on the Nationwide Tour until 2003 until retiring from the Tour.

Raulerson also played in Europe in 1992 and 1993 on the European Tour and the Challenge Tour. He won two Challenge Tour events in 1993.

Professional wins (5)

Nike Tour wins (2)

Challenge Tour wins (2)

Other wins (1)
1989 Jamaica Open

Results in major championships

CUT = missed the half-way cut
WD = withdrew
Note: Raulerson only played in the U.S. Open.

See also
1993 PGA Tour Qualifying School graduates
1998 Nike Tour graduates

External links

American male golfers
LSU Tigers golfers
PGA Tour golfers
European Tour golfers
Korn Ferry Tour graduates
Golfers from Jacksonville, Florida
1964 births
Living people